The Alabama–Tennessee League was a Class D minor league baseball league which operated in the United States in 1921. Four teams from Alabama and Tennessee competed in the league. The Albany-Decatur Twins won the first half of the season, and the Russellville Miners won the second half. The two teams met in a championship series, which was won by Albany-Decatur, 5–1.

Teams
Albany-Decatur Twins
Columbia Mules
Russellville Miners
Tri-Cities Triplets

Standings

References
General

Specific

Defunct minor baseball leagues in the United States
Baseball leagues in Alabama
Baseball leagues in Tennessee
Sports leagues established in 1921
Sports leagues disestablished in 1921